The 2015 Rhythmic Gymnastics World Championships, the 34th edition, was held in Stuttgart, Germany, from September 7 to 13, 2015 at the Porsche Arena.

Participating countries
List of delegations participating in Championship.

Schedule

Sep 7 Monday
 10:00-11:15 CI Individual group A – Hoop and Ball alternatively
 11:15-12:25 CI Individual group B – Hoop and Ball alternatively
 14:00-15:05 CI Individual group C – Hoop and Ball alternatively
 15:05-16:15 CI Individual group D – Hoop and Ball alternatively
Sep 8 Tuesday
 10:00-11:15 CI Individual group C – Hoop and Ball alternatively
 11:05-12:15 CI Individual group D – Hoop and Ball alternatively
 14:00-15:15 CI Individual, group A – Hoop and Ball alternatively
 15:15-16:25 CI Individual, group B – Hoop and Ball alternatively
 19:30-20:00 	Opening Ceremony
Finals
 20:00-20:30 CIII Individual Hoop
 20:35-21:00 CIII Individual Ball
Award Ceremony Individual Final Hoop
Award Ceremony Individual Final Ball
Sep 9 Wednesday
 10:00-11:35 CI Individual group D – Clubs and Ribbon alternatively
 11:55-13:20 CI Individual group C – Clubs and Ribbon alternatively
 15:00-16:35 CI Individual group B – Clubs and Ribbon alternatively
 16:55-18:30 CI Individual group A – Clubs and Ribbon alternatively
Sep 10 Thursday
 10:00-11:35 CI Individual group B – Clubs and Ribbon alternatively
 11:55-13:30 CI Individual group A – Clubs and Ribbon alternatively
 15:00-16:35 CI Individual group D – Clubs and Ribbon alternatively
 16:55-18:20 CI Individual group C – Clubs and Ribbon alternatively
Finals
 20:00-20:30 CIII Individual Clubs
 20:35-21:00 CIII Individual Ribbon
Award Ceremony Individual Final ClubsAward Ceremony Individual Final RibbonAward Ceremony Teams

Sep 11	Friday
Finals
 16:00-18:30 CII Individuals (gymnasts ranked 13-24)
 19:30-22:00 CII Individuals (gymnasts ranked 1-12)
Longines Prize of Elegance
Award ceremony Individual All-Around Final
Sep 12 Saturday
Finals
 12:26-14:26 CI Groups – 5 Ribbons and 6 Clubs + 2 Hoops alternatively
 14:38-16:38 CI Groups – 5 Ribbons and 6 Clubs + 2 Hoops alternatively
Award Ceremony General Competition Groups
Sep 13 Sunday
Finals
 13:02-13:42 CIII Groups – 5 Ribbons
 12:42-14:22 CIII Groups – 6 Clubs + 2 Hoops 
Award Ceremony Group Final 5 Ribbons
Award Ceremony Group Final 6 Clubs + 2 Hoops

Olympic qualification 

15 places for the Individual Competition and 10 places for the Group Competition at the 2016 Rio Olympic Games will be attributed directly based on the results of this competition. These places are non-nominative, meaning National Federations have the right to name the gymnasts who will represent them at the Olympic Games.

The top 15 individuals in the All-around final (C-II), will obtain an Olympic berth for their countries.

In the same way, the top eight Groups in the All-around competition will also qualify. An additional two Olympic berths will be attributed to Groups, keeping in mind that a minimum of three continents must be represented among the 10 Groups who advance to the Olympics from the World Championships. In other words, if the top 10 Groups at the World Championships are all from European countries, the top eight will advance directly to the Games, while the 9th and 10th qualifying spots will go to the highest placing Groups hailing from Africa, the Americas, Asia or Oceania.

Many of the gymnasts and Groups that do not qualify directly to the Olympic Games from the 2015 World Championships will have a second chance at the Olympic Games Test Event in April 2016.

Medal winners

* reserve gymnast

Individual

Teams Competition and Individual Qualification
Source:

Team competition is only for countries with at least 3 participating/entries of gymnasts.
Only gymnasts competing in at least 3 apparatus can compete for the all-around qualifications; with the top three highest scores counted. The top 24 in qualifications advance to the all-around finals.

Hoop 
Source:

Ball
Source:

Clubs
Source:

Ribbon
Source:

All-Around
Source:

Groups

At these championships the Russian Federation finally regained the gold medal at the all-around competition, after eight years, the last time they won the competition was at the 2007 World Rhythmic Gymnastics Championships held in Patras, Greece.

Group compositions

All-Around
Source:

5 Ribbons
Source:

6 Clubs + 2 Hoops
Source:

Medal table

References

External links
 Rhythmic Gymnastics World Championships Stuttgart 2015 official website at Gymnastik-wm.de (archive)
 34th Rhythmic Gymnastics World Championships 2015 Stuttgart (GER) - 2015 Sep 7-13 at RhythmicGymnasticsResults.com

World Rhythmic Gymnastics Championships
Rhythmic Gymnastics World Championships
Sports competitions in Stuttgart
International gymnastics competitions hosted by Germany
World Rhythmic Gymnastics Championships